Pud may refer to:
Pudding, a typically sweet food
 Comic strip mascot for Dubble Bubble
 A nickname of Albert Kent, a Canadian football coach and olympic rower
 Pud Galvin, a Hall of Fame Major League Baseball pitcher
 Pood or pud, an old Russian unit of weight
 slang shortened version of "pudendum"
PUD can be an acronym for
 Planned unit development
 Public utility district, a consumer co-op owned utility
 Peptic ulcer disease